American Playhouse is an American anthology television series periodically broadcast by Public Broadcasting Service (PBS).

Overview
It premiered on January 12, 1982, with The Shady Hill Kidnapping, written and narrated by John Cheever and directed by Paul Bogart. Its final broadcast, In the Wings: Angels in America on Broadway, a rerun of a behind-the-scenes look at Tony Kushner's award-winning play in two parts, aired on January 1, 1994.

The series proved to be the springboard for the careers of numerous performers, including David Marshall Grant, Laura Linney, A Martinez, Conchata Ferrell, Eric Roberts, Lynne Thigpen, John Malkovich, Peter Riegert, Lupe Ontiveros, Ben Stiller, and Megan Mullally.

As part of WGBH's development of the Descriptive Video Service (DVS), American Playhouse was one of the first U.S. television programs to air with audio description for the visually impaired on the Secondary audio program (SAP). After trialing the system during previous seasons, the 1990 season was the first to offer it as part of their wider rollout of DVS, initially through 32 member stations.

Episodes

Season 1 (1982)

Season 2 (1983)

Season 3 (1984)

Season 4 (1984–1985)

Season 5 (1986)

Season 6 (1987)

Season 7 (1988)

Season 8 (1989)

Season 9 (1990)

Season 10 (1991)

Season 11 (1992–1993)

Season 12 (1994)

Season 13 (1995–1996)

Notable cast

Tom Aldredge
Anne Bancroft
Christine Baranski
Claire Bloom
Jacques Boudet
Kenneth Branagh
Kate Burton
Jeff Daniels
Pedro De Pool
Ruby Dee
Matt Dillon
Olympia Dukakis
Megan Follows
Matt Frewer
Lillian Gish
Joanna Gleason
Danny Glover
Annie Golden
Louis Gossett Jr.
George Grizzard
Ed Harris
Rosemary Harris
Edward Herrmann
Helen Hunt
Glenda Jackson
James Earl Jones
Raul Julia
Swoosie Kurtz
Cloris Leachman
John Malkovich
Butterfly McQueen
Rita Moreno
Paul Newman
Geraldine Page
Sarah Jessica Parker
Estelle Parsons
Mandy Patinkin
Bernadette Peters
Vanessa Redgrave
Keanu Reeves
Lee Remick
Jason Robards
Esther Rolle
Liliane Rovère
Susan Sarandon
Sylvia Sidney
Jean Simmons
Gary Sinise
Anna Deavere Smith
Elaine Stritch
Richard Thomas
Anne Twomey
Dick Van Dyke
Chuck Wagner
Christopher Walken
Eli Wallach
Robert Westenberg
Lynn Whitfield
Paul Winfield
Alfre Woodard
Chip Zien

Accolades
Some of the productions won multiple Emmys: one from Robert Morse in Tru, Outstanding Children's Program for Displaced Person and technical achievements for The Meeting alongside many nominations.

Academy Award recognitions included El Norte'''s nomination for Best Original Screenplay,Robert Benton and Peter Shaffer winning Writing Oscars®-Oscars on YouTube a Best Actress nod for Jane Alexander in TestamentShirley MacLaine Wins Best Actress: 1984 Oscars and a Best Actor nod for Edward James Olmos in  Stand and Deliver.Dustin Hoffman Wins Best Actor: 1989 Oscars

Golden Globe recognitions included 3 for Stand and Deliver (two for Olmos (Leading Actor) and Diamond Phillips (Supporting Actor) and one for Best Motion Picture - Drama).American Playhouse also won a Peabody Award in 1990.

Legacy
Episodes like Nothing But a Man, The Thin Blue Line, El Norte and Stand and Deliver were each inducted into the National Film Registry.Overdrawn at the Memory Bank was featured as an episode of the cult science fiction series Mystery Science Theater 3000''.

References

External links

TV Guide
Chicago Tribune -  PBS` `American Playhouse`: A Multimedia Enterprise

 
1982 American television series debuts
1993 American television series endings
1980s American drama television series
1990s American drama television series
1980s American anthology television series
English-language television shows
PBS original programming
Peabody Award-winning television programs
1990s American anthology television series